Parahercostomus is a genus of flies in the family Dolichopodidae, known only from China. The generic name is a combination of the Greek prefix para- with the generic name Hercostomus.

Species
Parahercostomus kaulbacki (Hollis, 1964)
Parahercostomus orientalis Yang, Saigusa & Masunaga, 2001
Parahercostomus triseta Yang, Saigusa & Masunaga, 2001
Parahercostomus zhongdianus (Yang, 1998)

References

Dolichopodidae genera
Dolichopodinae
Diptera of Asia